Eucalyptus risdonii, commonly known as the Risdon peppermint, is a species of small tree that is endemic to a small area in southern Tasmania. It has smooth bark, a crown composed mostly of sessile, glaucous, egg-shaped juvenile leaves arranged in opposite pairs. The flower buds are arranged in groups of between nine and fifteen and the fruit are cup-shaped, conical or hemispherical.

Description
The bark is smooth, grey, yellow, white or cream-coloured. The crown is composed mostly of juvenile leaves. Flowering occurs from November to January and the flowers are white.

Taxonomy and naming
Eucalyptus risdonii was first formally described in 1847 by Joseph Dalton Hooker in the London Journal of Botany. The specific epithet (risdonii) refers to the locality Risdon, where the type specimen was found.

Distribution and habitat
The Risdon peppermint is only known from the dry slopes on the eastern side of the River Derwent near Risdon and Grass Tree Hill. It grows in low, open forest on sunny, north-west facing ridges.

This species is reported to be a juvenilised form of its sister species, E. tenuiramis.

Conservation status
This species is classed as "rare" under the Tasmanian Government Threatened Species Protection Act 1995.

References

External links

Flora of Tasmania
Endemic flora of Tasmania
Myrtales of Australia
Trees of Australia
Plants described in 1847
Taxa named by Joseph Dalton Hooker